Striga is a rural locality (a settlement) in Yudinskoye Rural Settlement, Velikoustyugsky District, Vologda Oblast, Russia. The population was 423 as of 2002. There are 6 streets.

Geography 
Striga is located 5 km northeast of Veliky Ustyug (the district's administrative centre) by road. Nikulino is the nearest rural locality.

References 

Rural localities in Velikoustyugsky District